Joo Koon (裕群) is an industrial estate in Jurong of the West Region of Singapore. East of Joo Koon is Lok Yang and South is Gul. Joo Koon consists mostly of factories.

It is bounded by Upper Jurong Road, the Pan Island Expressway, Jalan Ahmad Ibrahim and Benoi Road.

Amenities and landmarks
Surrounding Joo Koon industrial town are Pasir Laba Camp, SISPEC, SAFTI, Jurong Camp, Singapore Discovery Centre and Arena Country Club.

There is a food centre located along Joo Koon Way. There is also a NTUC FairPrice Warehouse Club, office units all comes under one roof at FairPrice Hub Joo Koon, which is the town hub.

Residential
There is a dormitory called Jurong Apartments located near Joo Koon MRT Station.

Transportation

Joo Koon MRT station is located at Joo Koon Circle in the eastern side of the industrial estate.

Joo Koon Bus Interchange was opened on 21 November 2015.

Neighbouring areas

References

Places in Singapore
West Region, Singapore
Lim Chu Kang
Pioneer, Singapore
Jurong West
Western Water Catchment